Michael Paul Sorrentino (born July 4, 1982), also known as The Situation, is an American television personality. He appeared on all six seasons of the MTV reality show Jersey Shore from 2009 through 2012 and returned to the franchise with Jersey Shore: Family Vacation.

Early life 
Sorrentino was born in the New York City borough of Staten Island and raised in Manalapan Township, New Jersey, where he graduated from Manalapan High School in 1999. He obtained an associate degree from Brookdale Community College and attended Kean University and Monmouth University.

Career 

Sorrentino was a cast member of Jersey Shore, which ran from 2009 to 2012. Since appearing on that show, Sorrentino has been a guest on TV series including The Howard Stern Show, The Tonight Show with Conan O'Brien, The Jay Leno Show, Lopez Tonight, SportsNation, Chelsea Lately, The Ellen DeGeneres Show, and Conan.

Sorrentino was a contestant on Season 11 of Dancing with the Stars. His partner was Karina Smirnoff. He made it to the 4th week before being eliminated.

In 2010, Sorrentino appeared with Bristol Palin in a public service announcement for The Candie's Foundation, as part of its Pause Before You Play campaign to prevent teen pregnancy.

In January 2011, Sorrentino signed on to star as a judge in the YOBI.tv talent-show web series New Stage.

Sorrentino made more than $5 million in 2010, the second highest of any other reality star after Kim Kardashian. This money was accrued through endorsements with Devotion Vodka, Reebok Zigtech shoes, as well as a ghost-written autobiography, a rap song, a workout DVD, a vitamin line for GNC, a clothing line, and appearances on Jersey Shore and Dancing with the Stars.

In March 2011, Sorrentino appeared on the Comedy Central Roast of Donald Trump. His performance was poorly received by audiences and critics. During his set, Sorrentino's jokes elicited jeers from the audience, prompting veteran roaster Jeff Ross to intervene. In August of that year, Sorrentino was offered $10,000 by fashion retailer Abercrombie & Fitch not to wear the company's clothes. A spokesman for the company explained that "Mr. Sorrentino's association with our brand could cause significant damage to our image." In November 2011, Sorrentino filed a lawsuit against A&F after they made shirts that read "The Fitchuation" and "GTL...You Know The Deal." This case, however, was dismissed before proceeding to trial.

On February 22, 2012, Sorrentino appeared in a small cameo role on ABC's Suburgatory. In June 2012, he participated in Fox's dating game show The Choice. On August 15, 2012 he became a housemate on the tenth series of Celebrity Big Brother on Channel 5 and on September 7, 2012 he came in fourth on the series final.

In October 2012, he appeared in a PETA advertising campaign promoting the spaying and neutering of pets.

In 2014, he appeared on a reality show with his family, which aired on the TVGN network. In the following year in 2015, he was a participant on the fifth season of Marriage Boot Camp: Reality Stars with his partner, Lauren Pesce.

In 2016, he was a participant on the 9th season of Worst Cooks in America.

In April 2017, Sorrentino appeared on We TV's Marriage Boot Camp: Reality Stars Family Edition  with his brothers Marc and Maximo Sorrentino.

In 2018, Sorrentino reunited with most of his Jersey Shore cast members in Jersey Shore: Family Vacation, a reboot of the series. The first and second seasons aired in 2018 with Sorrentino as a main cast member. It was confirmed in May 2019 that he will “be a huge part” of the third season, including documentation of his wedding,  court sentencing, and events leading up to his jail time.

Personal life 

Sorrentino has claimed his nickname "The Situation" came from when he was complimented regarding his physique while in public, causing a "situation" between an unnamed couple.

Sorrentino worked as an assistant manager of a fitness center in Staten Island. When he was 25, he lost this job and began underwear modeling.

In addition to his brothers, he has a younger sister, Melissa, who appeared as a bride in Say Yes to the Dress. Marc also served as the Situation's manager and partner in MPS Entertainment, LLC, and Situation Nation, Inc.

On March 21, 2012, Sorrentino publicly acknowledged that he had been struggling with an addiction to oxycodone, a prescription opioid pain medication. He also confirmed that he had entered rehab.  He checked out of the Cirque Lodge treatment center in Utah on April 4, 2012. Sorrentino says he has been sober since December 2015.

On June 17, 2014, Sorrentino was arrested for assault after a fight with his brother at their family's tanning salon in Middletown Township, New Jersey. He completed a 12-week anger management program in connection with the incident.

On April 26, 2018, Sorrentino announced he had become engaged to Lauren Pesce, his college sweetheart. They married on November 1, 2018. Sorrentino said in November 2019 that Pesce had suffered a miscarriage approximately seven weeks into her pregnancy. On November 24, 2020, Sorrentino announced they were again expecting a child in May 2021. Their son was born on May 26, 2021. On August 1, 2022, Sorrentino announced they were again expecting a child in January 2023. Their daughter Mia Bella Elizabeth Sorrentino was born January 24, 2023.

Tax evasion case 

In September 2014, Sorrentino was charged with tax fraud, for not paying taxes on $8.9 million. In April 2017, further charges were levied against Sorrentino and his brother, alleging tax evasion and the structuring of bank deposits to avoid reporting thresholds.

On January 19, 2018, Sorrentino pleaded guilty to one count of tax evasion, as part of a plea bargain with prosecutors. Sentencing occurred October 5, 2018 at the United States District Court of New Jersey in Newark. Sorrentino was sentenced to eight months in prison. He also received two years of supervised probation, to begin after his release, and was ordered to perform 500 hours of community service. Sorrentino began his sentence on January 15, 2019, at the Federal Correctional Institution, Otisville, in Otisville, New York. He was released on September 12, 2019.

Filmography

References

External links 
 

1982 births
Living people
American exercise instructors
American male erotic dancers
American people convicted of tax crimes
Male models from New York (state)
Brookdale Community College alumni
Kean University alumni
Manalapan High School alumni
Monmouth University alumni
Participants in American reality television series
People from Manalapan Township, New Jersey
People from Staten Island